The 1996 Northern Illinois Huskies football team represented Northern Illinois University as an independent during the 1996 NCAA Division I-A football season. Led by first-year head coach Joe Novak, the Huskies compiled a record of 1–10. Northern Illinois played home games at Huskie Stadium in DeKalb, Illinois.

Schedule

Roster

References

Northern Illinois
Northern Illinois Huskies football seasons
Northern Illinois Huskies football